The Bodhi Tree ("tree of awakening"), also called the Mahabodhi Tree, Bo Tree, is a large sacred fig tree (Ficus religiosa) located in Bodh Gaya, Bihar, India. Siddhartha Gautama, the spiritual teacher who became known as the Buddha, is said to have attained enlightenment or buddhahood circa 500 BCE under this tree. In religious iconography, the Bodhi Tree is recognizable by its heart-shaped leaves, which are usually prominently displayed.

The original tree under which Siddhartha Gautama sat is no longer living, but the term "bodhi tree" is also applied to existing sacred fig trees. The foremost example of an existing tree is the Mahabodhi Tree growing at the Mahabodhi Temple in Bodh Gaya, which is often cited as a direct descendant of the original tree. This tree, planted around 250 BCE, is a frequent destination for pilgrims, being the most important of the four main Buddhist pilgrimage sites.

Other holy bodhi trees with great significance in the history of Buddhism are the Anandabodhi Tree at Jetavana in Sravasti in North India and the Sri Maha Bodhi Tree in Anuradhapura, Sri Lanka. Both are also believed to have been propagated from the original Bodhi Tree.

The Forest Research Institute of India assists in the upkeep of the tree since 2007. Cloning has been considered in 2008. Its sacred leaves can also be bought by pilgrims as mementos. Religious offerings, which would draw insects, were shifted to some distance from the tree.

Origin and descendants

Bodh Gaya

The Bodhi tree at the Mahabodhi Temple is called the Sri Maha Bodhi. Gautama Buddha attained enlightenment (bodhi) while meditating underneath a Ficus religiosa. According to Buddhist texts, the Buddha meditated without moving from his seat for seven weeks (49 days) under this tree. A shrine called Animisalocana cetiya, was later erected on the spot where he sat.

The spot was used as a shrine even in the lifetime of the Buddha. Emperor Ashoka the Great was most diligent in paying homage to the Bodhi tree, and held a festival every year in its honour in the month of Kattika. His queen, Tissarakkhā, was jealous of the Tree, and three years after she became queen (i.e., in the nineteenth year of Asoka's reign), she cursed the tree to be killed by means of mandu thorns. The tree, however, grew again, and a great monastery was attached to the Bodhimanda called the Bodhimanda Vihara. Among those present at the foundation Kattika the Mahā Thūpa are mentioned thirty thousand monks from the Bodhimanda Vihara, led by Cittagutta.

The tree was again cut down by King Pushyamitra Shunga in the 2nd century BC, and by King Shashanka in 600 AD. In the 7th century AD, Chinese traveler Xuanzang wrote of the tree in detail. 

Every time the tree was destroyed, a new tree was planted in the same place.

In 1862 British archaeologist Alexander Cunningham wrote of the site as the first entry in the first volume of the Archaeological Survey of India:
The celebrated Bodhi tree still exists, but is very much decayed; one large stem, with three branches to the westward, is still green, but the other branches are barkless and rotten. The green branch perhaps belongs to some younger tree, as there are numerous stems of apparently different trees clustered together. The tree must have been renewed frequently, as the present Pipal is standing on a terrace at least 30 feet above the level of the surrounding country. It was in full vigour in 1811, when seen by Dr. Buchanan (Hamilton), who describes it as in all probability not exceeding 100 years of age.

However, the tree decayed further and in 1876 the remaining tree was destroyed in a storm. In 1881, Cunningham planted a new Bodhi tree on the same site.

To Jetavana, Sravasti

It is said that in the ancient Buddhist texts in order that people might make their offerings in the name of the Buddha when he was away on pilgrimage, the Buddha sanctioned the planting of a seed from the Bodhi tree in Bodhgaya in front of the gateway of Jetavana Monastery near Sravasti. For this purpose Moggallana took a fruit from the tree as it dropped from its stalk before it reached the ground. It was planted in a golden jar by Anathapindika with great pomp and ceremony. A sapling immediately sprouted forth, fifty cubits high, and in order to consecrate it, the Buddha spent one night under it, rapt in meditation. This tree, because it was planted under the direction of Ananda, came to be known as the Ananda Bodhi.

To Anuradhapura, Sri Lanka

King Asoka's daughter, Sanghamitta, brought a piece of the tree with her to Sri Lanka where it is continuously growing to this day in the island's ancient capital, Anuradhapura.
This Bodhi tree was originally named Jaya Sri Maha Bodhi. According to the Mahavamsa, the Sri Maha Bodhi in Sri Lanka was planted in 288 BC, making it the oldest verified specimen of any angiosperm. In this year (the twelfth year of King Asoka's reign) the right branch of the Bodhi tree was brought by Sanghamittā to Anurādhapura and placed by Devānāmpiyatissa his left foot in the Mahāmeghavana. The Buddha, on his death bed, had resolved five things, one being that the branch which should be taken to Ceylon should detach itself. From Gayā, the branch was taken to Pātaliputta, thence to Tāmalittī, where it was placed in a ship and taken to Jambukola, across the sea; finally it arrived at Anuradhapura, staying on the way at Tivakka. Those who assisted the king at the ceremony of the planting of the Tree were the nobles of Kājaragāma and of Candanagāma and of Tivakka.

The Jaya Sri Maha Bodhi is also known to be the most sacred Bodhi tree. This came upon the Buddhists who performed rites and rituals near the Bodhi tree. The Bodhi tree was known to cause rain and heal the ill. When an individual became ill, one of his or her relatives would visit the Bodhi tree to water it seven times for seven days and to vow on behalf of the sick for a speedy recovery.

To Honolulu, Hawaii

In 1913, Anagarika Dharmapala took a sapling of the Sri Maha Bodhi to Hawaii, where he presented it to his benefactor, Mary E. Foster, who had funded much Buddhist missionary work. She planted it in the grounds of her house in Honolulu, by the Nuʻuanu stream. On her death, she left her house and its grounds to the people of Honolulu, and it became the Foster Botanical Garden.

To Chennai, India

In 1950, Jinarajadasa took three saplings of the Sri Maha Bodhi to plant two saplings in Chennai, one was planted near the Buddha temple at the Theosophical Society another at the riverside of Adyar Estuary. The third was planted near a meditation center in Sri Lanka.

To Trấn Quốc, Hanoi, Vietnam

In 1959, to mark the visit of the first President of India, Shri Rajendra Prasad, a cutting of the original tree in Bodh Gaya was gifted and presently it stands as the Bodhi tree on the grounds of the Trấn Quốc pagoda.

To Thousand Oaks, California, USA
In 2012, Brahmanda Pratap Barua, Ripon, Dhaka, Bangladesh, took a sapling of Bodhi tree from Buddha Gaya, Maha Bodhi to Thousand Oaks, California, where he presented it to his benefactor, Anagarika Glenn Hughes, who had funded much Buddhist work and teaches Buddhism in the USA. He and his students received the sapling with a great thanks, later they planted the sapling in the ground in a nearby park.

To Nihon-ji, Japan 
In 1989, the government of India presented Nihon-ji with a sapling from the Bodhi Tree as a gesture of world peace.

To Deekshabhoomi, Nagpur
This Bodhi Tree was planted at Deekshabhoomi from three branches of the Bodhi Tree at Anuradhapura in Sri Lanka. Bhadant Anand Kausalyayan brought these branches from Sri Lanka as a memorial of Buddha's enlightenment. This site is holy to Navayana Buddhism as this is the place where Dr. B. R. Ambedkar converted to Buddhism along with 600,000 followers on 14 October 1956, Dhammachakra Pravartan Din.

Quezon City, Philippines
The sapling of the Sacred Bodhi tree from Anuradhapura Sri Lanka was planted on 15 May 2011, at Wisdom Park 14 Broadway Avenue, New Manila, Quezon City, Philippines by D. M. Jayaratne, Prime Minister of Sri Lanka, and Mariano S. Yupitun, the founder of Universal Wisdom Foundation Inc.

Mahabodhi trees of other Buddhas
Following is a list of the various Mahabodhi trees under which all of the Buddhas known to Theravada Buddhism attained buddhahood.

Celebrations

Bodhi Day
On 8 December, Bodhi Day celebrates Buddha's enlightenment underneath the Bodhi Tree. Those who follow the Dharma greet each other by saying, "Budu saranai!" which translates to "may the peace of the Buddha be yours." It is also generally seen as a religious holiday, much like Christmas in the Christian west, in which special meals are served, especially cookies shaped like hearts (referencing the heart-shaped leaves of the Bodhi) and a meal of kheer, the Buddha's first meal ending his six-year asceticism.

Bodhi Puja 
Bodhi Puja, meaning "the veneration of Bodhi-tree" is the ritual to worship the Bodhi tree and the deity residing on it (Pali: rukkhadevata; Sanskrit; vrikshadevata). It is done by giving various offerings such as food, water, milk, lamps, incense, etc. and chanting the verses of glory of Bodhi tree in Pali. The most common verse is:"Ime ete mahabodhi lokanathena pujita

ahampi te namassami bodhi raja namatthu te."

See also
List of individual trees
Rājāyatana tree
Sacred tree
Sahabi Tree

References

Further reading

External links

Bodh Gaya
Individual trees in India
Buddhist pilgrimage sites in India
Trees in Buddhism
Individual fig trees
Gautama Buddha